The Douglas DC-3 is a propeller-driven airliner
manufactured by Douglas Aircraft Company, which had a lasting effect on the airline industry in the 1930s to 1940s and World War II.

It was developed as a larger, improved 14-bed sleeper version of the Douglas DC-2.

(Although most DC-3s flying today use Pratt & Whitney R-1830 Twin Wasp engines, many DC-3s built for civil service originally had the Wright R-1820 Cyclone.)

The DC-3 had many exceptional qualities compared to previous aircraft.  It was fast, had a good range, was more reliable, and carried passengers in greater comfort. Before the war, it pioneered many air travel routes. It was able to cross the continental United States from New York to Los Angeles in 18 hours, with only three stops.
It is one of the first airliners that could profitably carry only passengers without relying on mail subsidies.

Following the war, the airliner market was flooded with surplus transport aircraft, and the DC-3 was no longer competitive due to its inadequate size and slow speed. It was made obsolete on main routes by more advanced types such as the Douglas DC-4 and Lockheed Constellation, but the design proved adaptable and useful on less commercially demanding routes.

Civilian DC-3 production ended in 1942 at 607 aircraft. Military versions, including the C-47 Skytrain (the Dakota in British RAF service), and Soviet- and Japanese-built versions, brought total production to over 16,000.

Many continued to be used in a variety of niche roles; 2,000 DC-3s and military derivatives were estimated to be still flying in 2013; a 2017 article put the number at that time at more than 300.

Design and development

"DC" stands for "Douglas Commercial". The DC-3 was the culmination of a development effort that began after an inquiry from Transcontinental and Western Airlines (TWA) to Donald Douglas. TWA's rival in transcontinental air service, United Airlines, was starting service with the Boeing 247, and Boeing refused to sell any 247s to other airlines until United's order for 60 aircraft had been filled. TWA asked Douglas to design and build an aircraft that would allow TWA to compete with United. Douglas' design, the 1933 DC-1, was promising, and led to the DC-2 in 1934. The DC-2 was a success, but with room for improvement.

The DC-3 resulted from a marathon telephone call from American Airlines CEO C. R. Smith to Donald Douglas, when Smith persuaded a reluctant Douglas to design a sleeper aircraft based on the DC-2 to replace American's Curtiss Condor II biplanes. Douglas agreed to go ahead with development only after Smith informed him of American's intention to purchase 20 aircraft. The new aircraft was engineered by a team led by chief engineer Arthur E. Raymond over the next two years, and the prototype DST (Douglas Sleeper Transport) first flew on December 17, 1935 (the 32nd anniversary of the Wright Brothers' flight at Kitty Hawk) with Douglas chief test pilot Carl Cover at the controls. No prototype was built, and the first DC-3 built followed seven DSTs off the production line for delivery to American Airlines.

The DC-3 and DST popularized air travel in the United States. Eastbound transcontinental flights could cross the U.S. in about 15 hours with three refueling stops, while westbound trips against the wind took  hours. A few years earlier, such a trip entailed short hops in slower and shorter-range aircraft during the day, coupled with train travel overnight.

Several radial engines were offered for the DC-3. Early-production civilian aircraft used either the 9-cylinder Wright R-1820 Cyclone 9 or the 14-cylinder Pratt & Whitney R-1830 Twin Wasp, but the Twin Wasp was chosen for most military versions and was also used by most DC-3s converted from military service. Five DC-3S Super DC-3s with Pratt & Whitney R-2000 Twin Wasps were built in the late 1940s, three of which entered airline service.

Production
Total production including all military variants was 16,079. More than 400 remained in commercial service in 1998. Production was:
 607 civilian variants
 10,048 military C-47 and C-53 derivatives built at Santa Monica, California, Long Beach, California, and Oklahoma City
 4,937 built under license in the Soviet Union (1939–1950) as the Lisunov Li-2 (NATO reporting name: Cab)
 487 Mitsubishi Kinsei-engined aircraft built by Showa and Nakajima in Japan (1939–1945), as the L2D Type 0 transport (Allied codename Tabby)

Production of DSTs ended in mid-1941 and civilian DC-3 production ended in early 1943, although dozens of the DSTs and DC-3s ordered by airlines that were produced between 1941 and 1943 were pressed into the US military service while still on the production line. Military versions were produced until the end of the war in 1945. A larger, more powerful Super DC-3 was launched in 1949 to positive reviews. The civilian market was flooded with second-hand C-47s, many of which were converted to passenger and cargo versions. Only five Super DC-3s were built, and three of them were delivered for commercial use. The prototype Super DC-3 served the US Navy with the designation YC-129 alongside 100 R4Ds that had been upgraded to the Super DC-3 specifications.

Turboprop conversions

From the early 1950s, some DC-3s were modified to use Rolls-Royce Dart engines, as in the Conroy Turbo Three. Other conversions featured Armstrong Siddeley Mamba or Pratt & Whitney PT6A turbines.

The Greenwich Aircraft Corp DC-3-TP is a conversion with an extended fuselage and with Pratt & Whitney Canada PT6A-65AR or PT6A-67R engines fitted.

The Basler BT-67 is a conversion of the DC-3/C-47.

South Africa-based Braddick Specialised Air Services International (commonly referred to as BSAS International) has also performed Pratt & Whitney PT6 turboprop conversions, having performed modifications on over 50 DC-3/C-47s / 65ARTP / 67RTP / 67FTPs.

Operational history

American Airlines inaugurated passenger service on June 26, 1936, with simultaneous flights from Newark, New Jersey and Chicago, Illinois. Early U.S. airlines like American, United, TWA, Eastern, and Delta ordered over 400 DC-3s. These fleets paved the way for the modern American air travel industry, which eventually replaced trains as the favored means of long-distance travel across the United States. A nonprofit group, Flagship Detroit Foundation, continues to operate the only original American Airlines Flagship DC-3 with air show and airport visits throughout the U.S.

In 1936, KLM Royal Dutch Airlines received its first DC-3, which replaced the DC-2 in service from Amsterdam via Batavia (now Jakarta) to Sydney, by far the world's longest scheduled route at the time. In total, KLM bought 23 DC-3s before the war broke out in Europe.  In 1941, a China National Aviation Corporation (CNAC) DC-3 pressed into wartime transportation service was bombed on the ground at Suifu Airfield in China, destroying the outer right wing. The only spare available was that of a smaller Douglas DC-2 in CNAC's workshops. The DC-2's right wing was removed, flown to Suifu under the belly of another CNAC DC-3, and bolted up to the damaged aircraft. After a single test flight, in which it was discovered that it pulled to the right due to the difference in wing sizes, the so-called DC-2½ was flown to safety.

During World War II, many civilian DC-3s were drafted for the war effort and more than 10,000 U.S. military versions of the DC-3 were built, under the designations C-47, C-53, R4D, and Dakota. Peak production was reached in 1944, with 4,853 being delivered.  The armed forces of many countries used the DC-3 and its military variants for the transport of troops, cargo, and wounded. Licensed copies of the DC-3 were built in Japan as the Showa L2D (487 aircraft); and in the Soviet Union as the Lisunov Li-2 (4,937 aircraft).

After the war, thousands of cheap ex-military DC-3s became available for civilian use. Cubana de Aviación became the first Latin American airline to offer a scheduled service to Miami when it started its first scheduled international service from Havana in 1945 with a DC-3. Cubana used DC-3s on some domestic routes well into the 1960s.

Douglas developed an improved version, the Super DC-3, with more power, greater cargo capacity, and an improved wing, but with surplus aircraft available for cheap, they failed to sell well in the civilian aviation market. Only five were delivered, three of them to Capital Airlines. The U.S. Navy had 100 of its early R4Ds converted to Super DC-3 standard during the early 1950s as the Douglas R4D-8/C-117D.  The last U.S. Navy C-117 was retired July 12, 1976. The last U.S. Marine Corps C-117, serial 50835, was retired from active service during June 1982. Several remained in service with small airlines in North and South America in 2006.

The United States Forest Service used the DC-3 for smoke jumping and general transportation until the last example was retired in December 2015.

A number of aircraft companies attempted to design a "DC-3 replacement" over the next three decades (including the very successful Fokker F27 Friendship), but no single type could match the versatility, rugged reliability, and economy of the DC-3. It remained a significant part of air transport systems well into the 1970s.

DC-3 today 

Perhaps unique among prewar aircraft, the DC-3 continues to fly in active commercial and military service as of 2021, eighty-six years after the type's first flight in 1935. There are still small operators with DC-3s in revenue service and as cargo aircraft. Current uses of the DC-3 include passenger service, aerial spraying, freight transport, military transport, missionary flying, skydiver shuttling and sightseeing. The very large number of civil and military operators of the DC-3/C-47 and related types makes a listing of all the airlines, air forces and other current operators impracticable.

A common saying among aviation enthusiasts and pilots is "the only replacement for a DC-3 is another DC-3".
Its ability to use grass or dirt runways makes it popular in developing countries or remote areas, where runways may be unpaved.

The oldest surviving DST is N133D, the sixth Douglas Sleeper Transport built, manufactured in 1936. This aircraft was delivered to American Airlines on 12 July 1936 as NC16005. In 2011 it was at Shell Creek Airport, Punta Gorda, Florida. It has been repaired and has been flying again. The most recent flight was on 25 April 2021. The oldest DC-3 still flying is the original American Airlines Flagship Detroit (c/n 1920, the 43rd aircraft off the Santa Monica production line, delivered on 2 March 1937), which appears at airshows around the United States and is owned and operated by the Flagship Detroit Foundation.

The base price of a new DC-3 in 1936 was around $60,000–$80,000, and by 1960 used examples were available for $75,000.

As of 2020 there are still aircraft being remanufactured and heavily modified to Basler BT-67 utility planes, for use by commercial cargo airlines.

Original operators

Variants

Civil
DST
Douglas Sleeper Transport; the initial variant with two  Wright R-1820 Cyclone engines and standard sleeper accommodation for up to 16 with small upper windows, convertible to carry up to 24 day passengers.
DST-A
DST with  Pratt & Whitney R-1830 Twin Wasp engines
DC-3
Initial non-sleeper variant; with 21 day-passenger seats,  Wright R-1820 Cyclone engines, no upper windows.
DC-3A
DC-3 with  Pratt & Whitney R-1830 Twin Wasp engines.
DC-3B
Version of DC-3 for TWA, with two  Wright R-1820 Cyclone engines and smaller convertible sleeper cabin forward with fewer upper windows than DST.

Designation for ex-military C-47, C-53, and R4D aircraft rebuilt by Douglas Aircraft in 1946, given new manufacturer numbers, and sold on the civil market; Pratt & Whitney R-1830 engines.
DC-3D
Designation for 28 new aircraft completed by Douglas in 1946 with unused components from the cancelled USAAF C-117 production line; Pratt & Whitney R-1830 engines.

Five completed by Douglas for civil use using existing surplus secondhand airframes. Three Super DC-3s were operated by Capital Airlines 1950–1952. Designation also used for examples of the 100 R4Ds that had been converted by Douglas to this standard for the U.S. Navy as R4D-8s (later designated C-117Ds), all fitted with more powerful Wright R-1820 Cyclone engines, some of which entered civil use after retirement from military service.

Military
C-41, C-41A
The C-41 was the first DC-3 to be ordered by the USAAC and was powered by two  Pratt & Whitney R-1830-21 engines. It was delivered in October 1938 for use by United States Army Air Corps (USAAC) chief General Henry H. Arnold with the passenger cabin fitted out in a 14-seat VIP configuration. The C-41A was a single VIP DC-3A supplied to the USAAC in September 1939, also powered by R-1830-21 engines; and used by the Secretary of War. The forward cabin converted to sleeper configuration with upper windows similar to the DC-3B.
C-48
Various DC-3A and DST models; 36 impressed as C-48, C-48A, C-48B, and C-48C.
C-48 - 1 impressed ex-United Air Lines DC-3A.
C-48A - 3 impressed DC-3As with 18-seat interiors.
C-48B - 16 impressed ex-United Air Lines DST-A air ambulances with 16-berth interiors.
C-48C - 16 impressed DC-3As with 21-seat interiors.
C-49
Various DC-3 and DST models; 138 impressed into service as C-49, C-49A, C-49B, C-49C, C-49D, C-49E, C-49F, C-49G, C-49H, C-49J, and C-49K.
C-50
Various DC-3 models, fourteen impressed as C-50, C-50A, C-50B, C-50C, and C-50D.
C-51
One impressed aircraft originally ordered by Canadian Colonial Airlines, had starboard-side door.
C-52
DC-3A aircraft with R-1830 engines, five impressed as C-52, C-52A, C-52B, C-52C, and C-52D.
C-68
Two DC-3As impressed with 21-seat interiors.
C-84
One impressed DC-3B aircraft.
Dakota II
British Royal Air Force designation for impressed DC-3s.
LXD1
A single DC-3 supplied for evaluation by the Imperial Japanese Navy Air Service (IJNAS).
R4D-2
Two Eastern Air Lines DC-3-388s impressed into United States Navy (USN) service as VIP transports, later designated R4D-2F and later R4D-2Z.
R4D-4
Ten DC-3As impressed for use by the USN.
R4D-4R
Seven DC-3s impressed as staff transports for the USN.
R4D-4Q
Radar countermeasures version of R4D-4 for the USN.

Conversions

Dart-Dakota for BEA test services, powered by two Rolls-Royce Dart turboprop engines.
Mamba-Dakota A single conversion for the Ministry of Supply, powered by two Armstrong-Siddeley Mamba turboprop engines.
Airtech DC-3/2000
DC-3/C-47 engine conversion by Airtech Canada, first offered in 1987. Powered by two PZL ASz-62IT radial engines.
Basler BT-67
DC-3/C-47 conversion with a stretched fuselage, strengthened structure, modern avionics, and powered by two Pratt & Whitney Canada PT-6A-67R turboprop engines.
BSAS C-47TP Turbo Dakota
A South African C-47 conversion for the South African Air Force by Braddick Specialised Air Services, with two Pratt & Whitney Canada PT6A-65R turboprop engines, revised systems, stretched fuselage, and modern avionics.
Conroy Turbo-Three
One DC-3/C-47 converted by Conroy Aircraft with two Rolls-Royce Dart Mk. 510 turboprop engines.
Conroy Super-Turbo-Three
Same as the Turbo Three but converted from a Super DC-3. One converted.
Conroy Tri-Turbo-Three
Conroy Turbo Three further modified by the removal of the two Rolls-Royce Dart engines and their replacement by three Pratt & Whitney Canada PT6s (one mounted on each wing and one in the nose).
Greenwich Aircraft Corp Turbo Dakota DC-3
DC-3/C-47 conversion with a stretched fuselage, strengthened wing center section, updated systems, and powered by two Pratt & Whitney Canada PT6A-65AR turboprop engines.
Ts-62
Douglas-built airframe fitted with Russian Shvetsov ASh-62 radial engines after World War II due to shortage of American engines in the Soviet Union.
Ts-82
Similar to Ts-62, but with Shvetsov ASh-82 radial engines of 1,650 hp.
USAC DC-3 Turbo Express
A turboprop conversion by the United States Aircraft Corporation, fitting Pratt & Whitney Canada PT6A-45R turboprop engines with an extended forward fuselage to maintain center of gravity. First flight of the prototype conversion, (N300TX), was on July 29, 1982.

Military and foreign derivatives

Douglas C-47 Skytrain and C-53 Skytrooper
Production military DC-3A variants.
Showa and Nakajima L2D
Developments manufactured under license in Japan by the Nakajima and Showa for the IJNAS; 487 built.
Lisunov Li-2 and PS-84
Developments manufactured under license in the USSR; 4,937 built.

Accidents and incidents

Specifications (DC-3A-S1C3G)

Notable appearances in media

See also

References

Notes

Bibliography
 Francillon, René. McDonnell Douglas Aircraft Since 1920: Volume I. London: Putnam, 1979. .
 Gradidge, Jennifer M. The Douglas DC-1/DC-2/DC-3: The First Seventy Years, Volumes One and Two. Tonbridge, Kent, UK: Air-Britain (Historians) Ltd., 2006. .
 Holden, Henry M.. The Douglas DC-3. Blue Ridge Summit, Pennsylvania: TAB Books, 1991. .
 Kaplan, Philip. Legend: A Celebration of the Douglas DC-3/C-47/Dakota. Peter Livanos & Philip Kaplan, 2009. .
 O'Leary, Michael. DC-3 and C-47 Gooney Birds. St. Paul, Minnesota: Motorbooks International, 1992. .
 O'Leary, Michael. When Fords Ruled the Sky (Part Two). Air Classics, Volume 42, No. 5, May 2006.
 Pearcy, Arthur. Douglas DC-3 Survivors, Volume 1. Bourne End, Bucks, UK: Aston Publications, 1987. .
 Pearcy, Arthur. Douglas Propliners: DC-1–DC-7. Shrewsbury, UK: Airlife Publishing, 1995. .
 
 Taylor, John W. R. Jane's All the World's Aircraft, 1982–83. London: Jane's Publishing Company, 1983. .
 
 Yenne, Bill. McDonnell Douglas: A Tale of Two Giants. Greenwich, Connecticut: Bison Books, 1985. .

External links

 Boeing: Historical Snapshot: DC-3 Commercial Transport
 DC-3/Dakota Historical Society
 The DC-3 Hangar – Douglas DC-3 specific site
 Centennial of flight Commission on the DC-3
 Douglas DC-3 at the Aviation History Online Museum

 
1930s United States airliners
World War II transport aircraft of the United States
DC-03
Low-wing aircraft
Aircraft first flown in 1935
Retractable conventional landing gear
Twin piston-engined tractor aircraft